Sophie Hedwig of Brunswick-Wolfenbüttel (13 June 1592, in Wolfenbüttel – 13 January 1642, in Arnhem), was Countess of Nassau-Dietz by marriage to
Ernest Casimir I, Count of Nassau-Dietz, and regent of the County of Nassau-Dietz during the absence of her sons between 1632 and 1642.

Life

Sophia was the daughter of Duke Henry Julius of Brunswick-Wolfenbüttel (1564–1613) and his second wife Princess Elisabeth of Denmark (1573–1625), the eldest daughter of King Frederick II of Denmark.

On 8 June 1607, Sophie Hedwig married Count Ernest Casimir I of Nassau-Dietz (1573–1632).

Regency

When she was widowed, Sophia took up residence at widow seat, the Countly Castle at Diez. Nassau-Dietz had been inherited by her eldest son, who was twenty and old enough to rule on his own. He was however appointed governor of Friesland, and appointed his mother as his regent to rule in his absence.

She and managed to minimize damage caused during the Thirty Years' War. She prevented looting and quartering in the city and county during the Thirty Years' War by skillfully negotiating with army commanders. Sophia made a name for herself outside the county when she turned to Axel Oxenstierna in 1633 and demanded compensation for the damage his troops had done to her territory. Domestically, she cared for the rural population and made sure there was a sufficient supply of food and water. When Diez was affected by a plague epidemic in 1635, she was ready to help.

Sophia was a Calvinist, but this did not prevent her from benefitting from a cooperation with her brother-in-law John Louis of Nassau-Hadamar, who had reverted to Catholicism.

When her eldest son died and was succeeded by her youngest son in 1640, she was confirmed in her position as regent and continued to rule.

Issue

Only two of her children reached adulthood:

Henry Casimir I (1612–1640), fell in battle during the Siege of Hulst
William Frederick (1613–1664)

The English representative at the baptism of Henry Casimir in March 1612 at Arnhem was Sir Edward Cecil. Cecil brought gifts of a cupboard of gilt plate, a diamond necklace with a locket, two horses, and an embroidered petticoat for Sophia Hedwig, who was a niece of Anne of Denmark. The Dutch Republic gave a gift of an annual pension.

Legacy
In the mid-1990s, the gymnasium in Diez was named after her: Sophie-Hedwig-Gymnasium.

A street in Diez was named after her.

References

Middle House of Brunswick
Duchesses of Brunswick-Lüneburg
1592 births
1642 deaths
17th-century German politicians
17th-century women rulers
Daughters of monarchs